The Aranama were an Indigenous people who lived along the San Antonio and Guadalupe rivers of present-day Texas, near the Gulf Coast.

Language 
Aranama people spoke the Aranama language, a poorly attested language that went extinct in the mid-19th century. It may have been a Coahuiltecan language but remains unclassified.

History 

Many Aranama people moved to Mission Nuestra Señora del Espíritu Santo de Zúñiga at its second and third locations. Several times, they left the mission to move north, and occasionally joined the Tawakonis. Each time, the Spanish colonists convinced them to return.

Some Aranama people also joined San Antonio de Valero in San Antonio and Nuestra Señora del Refugio in Refugio.

References 

Extinct Native American peoples
Indigenous peoples of Aridoamerica
Native American history of Texas
Native American tribes in Texas